The Workers' Union was a general union based in the United Kingdom, but with some branches in other countries.  During the 1910s, it was the largest general union in the UK, but it entered a rapid decline in the 1920s, and eventually became part of the Transport and General Workers' Union (TGWU).

History
The idea for a general union arose following an 1897 strike of London-based engineers.  The action was defeated by the new Engineering Employers' Federation, and many trade unionists feared that this example would be followed by other employers.  Discussions in the Weekly Times and Echo led to the International Federation of Ship, Dock and River Workers issuing an appeal for the formation of a new general union.  The federation's president, Tom Mann, gave the appeal strong support, chairing a conference in February 1898 which proposed a "labour league" or "workers' union", which would organise workers in all trades and industries, and support independent labour candidates at elections.

The first branches of the union were formed in April 1898 in Bradford, Halifax, Leeds, London, Manchester, Middlesbrough and Oldham, with the union officially launched on May Day.  Charles Duncan was employed as president and general organiser, while Tom Chambers as general secretary and Mann as vice president came from the international federation, and worked only part-time for the union 

Initially, the union was unsuccessful, membership peaking at 4,172 at the end of 1898.  For example, recruitment at both the Army & Navy Stores and Lipton's Tea led to industrial action, and short booms in membership followed by defeats and then a collapse in membership.  William Banham and J. Wade were employed as full-time local organisers in London, while other early organisers included John Mahoney in Middlesbrough, and George Newcombe in Coventry, but all had left by the end of 1901.  From late 1900, Chambers and Mann were forced to devote their time to the international federation, Chambers being replaced by Duncan, who in turn was succeeded as president by Robert Morley, while Mann retained his office as an honorary position.  Duncan successfully brought the union's finances under control, and began offering optional benefits to out-of-work members.  For the next few years, membership continued to fall, bottoming out at only 1,000 in 1903, but it then began growing, reaching 5,000 in 1910.  New organisers were employed, including George Titt in Manchester, Joseph Harris in Ireland, and Matt Giles in South Wales, while John Beard, who had been working part-time for the union among agricultural workers, was transferred to a full-time post in Birmingham.

1911 saw increased unrest among workers in the UK, and the Workers' Union capitalised on this.  Membership increased rapidly, to 18,000 by the end of 1911, 91,000 by the end of 1913, and 143,000 by mid-1914.  It was now a similar size to the National Union of Gasworkers and General Labourers, the largest general union in the UK.  The additional funds allowed Duncan to launch a publicity campaign, principally through the Daily Citizen, and take on several members of administrative staff, and increase the number of full-time organisers from six to forty.  They included George Dallas in London, and George Kerr in Scotland
Beard defeated Morley in the 1913 presidential election, his victory coming on the back of the recruitment of large numbers of semi-skilled engineering workers in the West Midlands by him, Arthur Ellery, and Julia Varley.  The union also recruited strongly among agricultural workers, with Sidney Box and R. O. Hornagold being the principal organisers.

On formation, the union affiliated to the Trades Union Congress (TUC) and the General Federation of Trade Unions, but it left both bodies in 1900, as a money-saving measure.  It attempted to rejoin the TUC in 1913, but was blocked by other unions which claimed that it was poaching their members.  The union was a founder member of the Labour Representation Committee, and remained affiliated as it became the Labour Party.  Despite its original aim of sponsoring labour candidates, it was unable to do so until 1918.  However, Duncan managed to gain the sponsorship of the Amalgamated Society of Engineers, and served as an MP from 1906 onwards.  The union's leadership supported World War I, with both Beard and Duncan joining the British Workers' League, although they left in 1918 when it supported anti-Labour Party Parliamentary candidates.  Duncan and Morley stood for the Labour Party in the 1918 UK general election, but both were unsuccessful.  Neil Maclean, a union member, did win a seat with the backing of the Independent Labour Party, and in 1919 he was elected to the union's executive.

The union's growth stalled during World War I, but then leapt dramatically in 1918, reaching 495,000 by the end of the year, making it the largest trade union in the country.  It tried to recruit more women, and by the end of the war had twenty women organisers, who succeeded to take women's membership from 5,000 to 80,000 by the end of the war.  The union also recruited among Belgian refugee engineers, who at the end of the war were transferred to the Belgian Metal Workers' Union.  A large number of small, localised unions amalgamated in, with the National Farm and Dairy Workers' Union and Anglesey Workers' Union boosting agricultural membership, which peaked at around 120,000, and the National Union of Government Employees, led by Arthur Gourd, boosting membership in dockyards, which peaked at about 25,000.  Expansion allowed the opening of an arbitration department, led by William Kelly, and the opening of new headquarters in Golders Green.  A divisional structure was adopted in 1915, with Beard, Dallas, Ellery, Giles, Harris, Kerr, Morley and Titt appointed to head the new divisions, supplemented after the war by William Adamson, Gourd, Hugh Lawrie, Tom Macnamara (soon succeeded by Alf Edmonds), and James McKeag.  In addition, the union led a successful general strike on the Isle of Man, and opened branches in Gibraltar, Malta and Tangier.

In 1919, the union joined the National Amalgamated Workers Union, a loose confederation with the Municipal Employees Association and the National Amalgamated Union of Labour, but this dissolved in 1922.

Membership of the union collapsed during the 1920s, with job losses due to the depression, the General Strike of 1926 and disputes over payments to members of the executive committee.  In 1929, it merged into the Transport and General Workers' Union (TGWU), with about 100,000 members remaining to transfer.  This enabled the TGWU, for the first time, to gain significant numbers of members outside of the docks and transport industries.

Election results
The union sponsored Labour Party candidates in numerous Parliamentary elections, several of whom won election.

Officials

General Secretaries
1898: Tom Chambers
1900: Charles Duncan

Presidents
1898: Charles Duncan
1900: Robert Morley
1913: John Beard

References

External links
Catalogue of the WU archives, held at the Modern Records Centre, University of Warwick
Catalogue of Richard Hyman's research papers on the WU, held at the Modern Records Centre, University of Warwick

 
Trade unions established in 1898
Trade unions disestablished in 1929
1929 disestablishments in the United Kingdom
Defunct trade unions of the United Kingdom
1898 establishments in the United Kingdom
Transport and General Workers' Union amalgamations
Trade unions based in London